In politics, triangulation is a strategy associated with U.S. president Bill Clinton in the 1990s. The politician presents a position as being above or between the left and right sides (or "wings") of a democratic political spectrum. It involves adopting for oneself some of the ideas of one's political opponent. The logic behind it is that it both takes credit for the opponent's ideas, and insulates the triangulator from attacks on that particular issue.

Origins
The political use of the old term was first used by Bill Clinton's chief political advisor Dick Morris as a way to describe his strategy for getting Clinton reelected in the 1996 presidential election. The opposition Republicans had scored a landslide to take control of Congress in the midterm elections of 1994. Clinton needed to pass and take credit for legislation by winning over a coalition of moderate Republicans and Democrats, abandoning the Progressive Democrats he had previously worked with. In Dick Morris' words, triangulation meant "the president needed to take a position that not only blended the best of each party's views but also transcended them to constitute a third force in the debate." In news articles and books, it is sometimes referred to as "Clintonian triangulation". Morris advocated a set of policies that were different from the traditional policies of the Democratic Party. These policies included deregulation and balanced budgets. One of the most widely cited capstones of Clinton's triangulation strategy was when, in his 1996 State of the Union Address, Clinton declared that the "era of big government is over."

Commentators have sometimes speculated that Clinton's emphasis on entrepreneurship and the post-industrial sector was the co-option of conservative ideas first presented by Reagan Republicans in the 1980s. However Brent Cebul argues that triangulation represented a traditional liberal effort to structure the economy with the goals of creating new jobs, and producing fresh tax revenues that can support progressive policy innovations. Cebul claims this tradition goes back to the local and state policies inspired by the New Deal, and the "supply-side liberalism" of the 1970s.

Other use
Politicians alleged to have used triangulation more recently include US President Barack Obama, former U.S. Secretary of State Hillary Clinton, Tony Blair with "New Labour" in the United Kingdom, Jean Chrétien and Paul Martin with the Liberal Party of Canada, Fredrik Reinfeldt with "The New Moderates" in Sweden, Bob Hawke, Paul Keating, and Kevin Rudd of the Australian Labor Party and Nicola Sturgeon of the Scottish National Party.

During the 2010 State of the Union Address,  President Obama insisted that he would remain with his agenda in the face of criticism, rather than resort to triangulation.

See also
 Economic policy of the Bill Clinton administration
 Radical centrism
 Sister Souljah moment
 Third Way

References

Further reading
 Cebul, Brent. "Supply-Side Liberalism: Fiscal Crisis, Post-Industrial Policy, and the Rise of the New Democrats". Modern American History 2.2 (July 2019): 139–164. . Archive online.
 Nesmith, Bruce F., and Paul J. Quirk, "Triangulation: Position and Leadership in Clinton's Domestic Policy". In 42: Inside the Presidency of Bill Clinton, edited by Michael Nelson at al. (Cornell UP, 2016). pp. 46–76. . .

Political terminology